In linear algebra, a Vandermonde matrix, named after Alexandre-Théophile Vandermonde, is a matrix with the terms of a geometric progression in each row: an  matrix

or

Some authors define the Vandermonde matrix as the transpose of the above matrix.

The determinant of a square Vandermonde matrix is called a Vandermonde polynomial or Vandermonde determinant. Its value is the polynomial

which is non-zero if and only if all  are distinct.

The Vandermonde determinant was sometimes called the discriminant, although, presently, the discriminant of a polynomial is the square of the Vandermonde determinant of the roots of the polynomial.

Proofs
The main property of a square Vandermonde matrix

is that its determinant has the simple form

Three proofs of this equality are given below. The first one uses polynomial properties, especially the unique factorization property of multivariate polynomials. Although conceptually simple, it involves non-elementary concepts of abstract algebra. The second proof does not require any explicit computation, but involves the concepts of the determinant of a linear map and change of basis. It provides also the structure of the LU decomposition of the Vandermonde matrix. The third one is more elementary and more complicated, using only elementary row and column operations.

Using polynomial properties

All entries of the th column have total degree . Thus, again by the Leibniz formula, all terms of the determinant have total degree 

(that is the determinant is a homogeneous polynomial of this degree).

By the unique factorization property of multivariate polynomials, the product of all  divides , that is 

where  is a polynomial. As the product of all  and  have the same degree  the polynomial  is, in fact, a constant.

which is also the monomial that is obtained by taking the first term of all factors in  This proves that

Using linear maps
Let 

be the linear map defined by 

Changing the basis of  amounts to multiplying the Vandermonde matrix by a change-of-basis matrix  (from the right).

Their matrix on the monomial basis is an upper-triangular matrix  (if the monomials are ordered in increasing degrees), with all diagonal entries equal to one. This matrix is thus a change-of-basis matrix of determinant one.

Thus Vandermonde determinant equals the determinant of this matrix, which is the product of its diagonal entries. 

This proves the desired equality.

By row and column operations

This third proof is based on the fact that if one adds to a column of a matrix the product by a scalar of another column then the determinant remains unchanged.

So, by subtracting to each column – except the first one – the preceding column multiplied by  the determinant is not changed. (These subtractions must be done by starting from last columns, for subtracting a column that has not yet been changed). This gives the matrix 

Applying the Laplace expansion formula along the first row, we obtain , with

As all the entries in the -th row of  have a factor of  one can take these factors out and obtain

Resulting properties

An  rectangular Vandermonde matrix such that  has maximum rank  if and only if all  are distinct. 

An explicit formula for the inverse is known.

Applications
The Vandermonde matrix evaluates a polynomial at a set of points; formally, it is the matrix of the linear map that maps the vector of coefficients of a polynomial to the vector of the values of the polynomial at the values appearing in the Vandermonde matrix. The non-vanishing of the Vandermonde determinant for distinct points  shows that, for distinct points, the map from coefficients to values at those points is a one-to-one correspondence, and thus that the polynomial interpolation problem is solvable with a unique solution; this result is called the unisolvence theorem, and is a special case of the Chinese remainder theorem for polynomials.

However, the interpolation polynomial is generally easier to compute with the Lagrange interpolation formula, which may also be used for deriving a formula for the inverse of a Vandermonde matrix. 

The Vandermonde determinant is used in the representation theory of the symmetric group.

When the values  belong to a finite field, then the Vandermonde determinant is also called a 
Moore determinant and has specific properties that are used, for example, in the theory of BCH code and Reed–Solomon error correction codes.

The discrete Fourier transform is defined by a specific Vandermonde matrix, the DFT matrix, where the numbers αi are chosen to be roots of unity.
Using the Fast Fourier Transform it is possible to compute the product of a Vandermonde matrix with a vector in  time.

The Laughlin wavefunction with filling factor one (appearing in the Quantum Hall effect), by the formula for the Vandermonde determinant, can be seen to be a Slater determinant. This is not true anymore for filling factors different from one, i.e., in the fractional Quantum Hall effect.

It is the design matrix of polynomial regression.

It is the normalized volume of arbitrary -faces of cyclic polytopes. Specifically, if  is a -face of the cyclic polytope   (where ), then

Confluent Vandermonde matrices
As described before, a Vandermonde matrix describes the linear algebra interpolation problem of finding the coefficients of a polynomial  of degree  based on the values , where  are distinct points. If  are not distinct, then this problem does not have a unique solution (which is reflected by the fact that the corresponding Vandermonde matrix is singular). However, if we give the values of the derivatives at the repeated points, then the problem can have a unique solution. For example, the problem

where  is a polynomial of degree ≤ 2, has a unique solution for all . In general, suppose that  are (not necessarily distinct) numbers, and suppose for ease of notation that equal values come in continuous sequences in the list. That is

Then the corresponding interpolation problem is

And the corresponding matrix for this problem is called a confluent Vandermonde matrices. In our case (which is the general case, up to permuting the rows of the matrix) the formula for it is given as follows: if , then  for some (unique)  (we consider ). Then, we have

This generalization of the Vandermonde matrix makes it non-singular (such that there exists a unique solution to the system of equations) while retaining most properties of the Vandermonde matrix. Its rows are derivatives (of some order) of the original Vandermonde rows.

Another way to receive this formula is to let some of the 's go arbitrarily close to each other. For example, if , then letting  in the original Vandermonde matrix, the difference between the first and second rows yields the corresponding row in the confluent Vandermonde matrix. This allows us to link the generalized interpolation problem (given value and derivatives on a point) to the original case where all points are distinct: Being given  is similar to being given  where  is very small.

See also
 
 Schur polynomial – a generalization
 Alternant matrix
 Lagrange polynomial
 Wronskian
 List of matrices
 Moore determinant over a finite field
 Vieta's formulas

References

Further reading
.

External links

Matrices
Determinants
Numerical linear algebra